The Very Best of the Human League may refer to:

The Very Best of the Human League (1998 album)
The Very Best of the Human League (2003 album)
The Very Best of the Human League (DVD)